Stein Mehren (16 May 1935 – 28 July 2017) was a Norwegian poet, essayist and playwright. He made his literary debut as poet with Gjennom stillheten en natt (1960). He wrote more than fifty books, mainly poetry.

Background
Mehren was born in Oslo, Norway to physician and dentist Haakon Mehren (1910–38) and Solveig Marie Klaveness Bjerke (1908–55).
He was a nephew of merchant Martin Mehren (1905–2002). After graduating from secondary school in 1953, Mehren studied philosophy at the University of Oslo for several years.

Career
He made his literary debut with the poetry collection Gjennom stillheten en natt in 1960. Other collections from the 1960s are Alene med en himmel (1962), Mot en verden av lys (1963), Gobelin Europa (1965), Tids alder (1966), and Aurora. Det Niende Mørke (1969). Among his essay collections are Samtidsmuseet og andre tekster (1966), Maskinen og menneskekroppen (1970), and Myten og den irrasjonelle fornuft (two volumes, 1977 and 1980). He has written two plays, Narren og hans hertug (1968, staged at Nationaltheatret), and Den store søndagsfrokosten (1976). In the 1970s he wrote two novels, De utydelige (1972) and Titanene (1974).

Awards
Mehren received the Norwegian Critics Prize for Literature and the Mads Wiel Nygaards Endowment in 1963 for Mot en verden av lys. 
He was awarded the Swedish Academy’s Dobloug Prize in 1971. He received Aschehougprisen in 1973, the Riksmål Society Literature Prize in 1975, the Fritt Ord Award in 1979, the Norwegian Academy Prize in memory of Thorleif Dahl in 1987 and the Gyldendalprisen in 2004.
In 1993, he was awarded the Anders Jahre Cultural Prize (Anders Jahres kulturpris) jointly with pianist Robert Levin.

Personal life
From 1964 to 1975 he was married to Tove Halvorsen, then to Siri Hjemdal from 1979 to 1981.

References

 
 
 



1935 births
2017 deaths
Writers from Oslo
University of Oslo alumni
20th-century Norwegian poets
Norwegian male poets
20th-century Norwegian novelists
Norwegian dramatists and playwrights
Norwegian essayists
Dobloug Prize winners
Norwegian male novelists
Norwegian male dramatists and playwrights
Male essayists
20th-century essayists
20th-century Norwegian male writers